Whitebridge is a suburb of Newcastle, New South Wales, Australia,  from Newcastle's central business district on the eastern side of Lake Macquarie. It is part of the City of Lake Macquarie local government area.

History 
The Awabakal are the traditional people of this area.

The area was named after a white truss bridge that crosses the Belmont Railway Line later replaced by a concrete bridge now part of Dudley Road. Coal mining was started at Whitebridge in 1888 at the Burwood No.3 Colliery. This mine operated for almost a century, and was one of Australia's greatest coal producers. It closed in 1982. Whitebridge High School opened in 1963.

References

External links 
 History of Whitebridge (Lake Macquarie City Library)

Suburbs of Lake Macquarie